Dr. Randall J. Strossen is the founder and president of IronMind Enterprises, Inc. and the editor-in-chief and publisher of MILO journal.  He wrote a monthly column called "IronMind" in IRONMAN magazine for over 12 years, starting in 1988 and has authored several books on strength training.  As a photo-journalist, Strossen has covered top strength events, including four Olympic Games, worldwide for the past 20 years. Strossen earned a PhD in psychology from Stanford University.

Bibliography

 Super Squats: How to Gain 30 Pounds of Muscle in 6 Weeks (1989). .
 IronMind: Stronger Minds, Stronger Bodies (1994). .  A compilation of the first 60 "IronMind" columns from IRONMAN.
 Paul Anderson, The Mightiest Minister (1999). .
 Captains of Crush Grippers: What They Are and How To Close Them, Second Edition. (2009). .
 Winning Ways: How To Succeed In The Gym And Out (2004). .  A compilation of the final 85 "IronMind" columns from IRONMAN.

External links
Ironmind.com

1951 births
Living people
American exercise and fitness writers
Strength training writers
Stanford University alumni